Jeannette Boudreault-Lagassé ( in Dosquet, Quebec –  in Montreal, Quebec.) was a Quebec writer.

Bibliography 
 1991: Rires et sourires avec nos ancêtres (English: Laughs and smiles with our ancestors), Jeannette (Boudreault) and Robert Lagassé, Éditions Mémoire.
 1992: 1867 Comme si vous y étiez (English: 1867 As if you were there) Jeannette (Boudreault) and Robert Lagassé, Éditions Mémoire.
 1994: Rires et sourires avec nos ancêtres (English: Laughs and smiles with our ancestors, II), Jeannette (Boudreault) and Robert Lagassé, Éditions Mémoire.
 1994: Crimes Humains, Justice Humaine (English: Human Crimes, Human Justice) , Jeannette (Boudreault) and Robert Lagassé, Éditions Mémoire.
 2005: Répertoire des Baptêmes, Mariages et Sépultures de la Paroisse Saint-Octave de Dosquet, Comté de Lotbinière, Qc, 1913–1941 (English: Directory of Baptisms, Weddings and Burials of the Saint-Octave Parish of Dosquet, County of Lotbinière, Qc, 1913–1941), Jeannette Boudreault-Lagassé, Longueuil Genealogy Club.
 2005: Répertoire des Baptêmes, Mariages et Sépultures de la Paroisse Saint-Raymond-De-Pennafort, Comté de Wolfe, QC, 1913–1940 (English: Directory of Baptisms, Weddings and Burials of the Saint-Raymond-De-Pennafort Parish, Wolfe County, QC, 1913–1940), Jeannette (Boudreault) and Robert Lagassé, }, Longueuil Genealogy Club.

References

External links 

 Bookfinder
 Bibliothèque Nationale du Québec

Writers from Quebec
Canadian writers in French
1941 births
2006 deaths